Andrei Anatolyevich Mikhnevich (born 12 July 1976 in Babruysk) is a Belarusian shot putter with a personal best of 21.69 metres, set in 2003. In 2013 he was banned from sports for life due to his second doping positive.

He started competing at global championships in 1999 and attended the 2000 Summer Olympics, but he was banned for a doping offence in 2001. He returned after a two-year suspension and promptly became the shot put world champion at the 2003 World Championships in Athletics. He took part in the 2004 Athens Olympics and the 2005 World Championships but failed to reach the global podium over this period.

He had a resurgence of form in 2006, taking silver at the IAAF World Indoor Championships as well as silver at the 2006 European Athletics Championships. He won the bronze at the 2007 World Championships and took his first Olympic honour, another bronze medal, at the 2008 Beijing Olympics. He won indoor world silver for a second time at the 2010 IAAF World Indoor Championships and the gold medal at the 2010 European Championships in Barcelona.

In 2012 IAAF retested doping samples from the 2005 World Athletics Championships and Mikhnevich was found positive for 3 anabolic steroids: Clenbuterol, Methandienone and Oxandrolone. He was subsequently banned from sports for life, and the results from 6 August 2005 onwards were annulled. He lost the silver medals from the World Indoor Championships in 2006 and 2010, and the bronze medals from the 2007 and 2011 IAAF World Championships. In August 2014 IOC also disqualified his results from the 2008 Summer Olympics and re-allocated the bronze medal.

Career
He made his first major championships appearance at the 1999 IAAF World Indoor Championships and he finished eighth overall. He also attended the 1999 World Championships in Athletics that year but did not reach the final. His first Olympics soon followed at the 2000 Sydney Games where he finished ninth in the shot put final.

He received a two-year suspension for a doping offence on 7 August 2001. He had tested positive for Human chorionic gonadotropin at the 2001 World Athletics Championships in Edmonton and his results from the championships were annulled. Only 17 days after his suspension ended he became world champion in Paris with a personal best throw of 21.69 metres. He also won the Universiade the same year. His best performance in the following two years was a fifth place at the 2004 Summer Olympics.

In 2006 he finished second both at the World Indoor Championships in Moscow, with a new personal indoor best throw of 21.37 metres, and the 2006 European Championships with 21.11. He followed this with a bronze medal at the 2007 World Championships.

He finished fifth at the 2008 IAAF World Indoor Championships but rebounded to peak with a 22.00 m personal best in July and taking his first Olympic medal at the 2008 Beijing Olympics in the form of a bronze. This medal would later be retracted and awarded to Canadian rival Dylan Armstrong, for doping offences.  He sank back down the rankings at the 2009 World Championships, finishing seventh, but he gained his second indoor silver at the 2010 World Indoors a few months later. He set a national indoor record of 21.81 m in Mogilev, Belarus, and continued his good form with a win at the 2010 European Cup Winter Throwing meeting. He followed that victory by winning the 2010 European Championships in Barcelona. All his results from August 2005 and onwards were later disqualified after re-tests showed he had doped at the 2005 World Athletics Championships, and in 2013 the IAAF banned him for life.

His wife is fellow shot-putter Natallia Mikhnevich, who won a silver medal at the 2008 Olympic Games. She was handed a two-year ban from sports after she tested positive for Stanozolol in 2013.

Personal bests

All information taken from IAAF profile.

Achievements

References

External links

1976 births
Living people
People from Babruysk
Belarusian male shot putters
Athletes (track and field) at the 2000 Summer Olympics
Athletes (track and field) at the 2004 Summer Olympics
Athletes (track and field) at the 2008 Summer Olympics
Athletes (track and field) at the 2012 Summer Olympics
Olympic athletes of Belarus
Doping cases in athletics
Belarusian sportspeople in doping cases
World Athletics Championships medalists
Competitors stripped of Summer Olympics medals
Universiade medalists in athletics (track and field)
Athletes stripped of World Athletics Championships medals
Universiade gold medalists for Belarus
World Athletics Championships winners
Medalists at the 2003 Summer Universiade
Sportspeople from Mogilev Region